The Brothers Wilderness is a designated wilderness area located in the Olympic National Forest on the eastern side of the Olympic Peninsula south of Buckhorn Wilderness and north of Mount Skokomish Wilderness. The wilderness area comprises  administered by the U.S. Forest Service. The Duckabush River flows through the middle of the area.

History
In 1984, the U.S. Congress established five wilderness areas within Olympic National Forest:
 Buckhorn Wilderness
 Colonel Bob Wilderness
 Mount Skokomish Wilderness
 The Brothers Wilderness
 Wonder Mountain Wilderness

The Brothers Wilderness sits along the eastern flank of the Olympic Wilderness, which was created in 1988.

Recreation
Multiple trails can be used to reach The Brothers Wilderness for backpacking, mountain climbing, hunting, hiking, camping, and fishing. The three-mile Brothers Trail provides access to climbing routes up the double-summit peak of the same name. The Duckabush Trail follows the Duckabush River and then enters Olympic National Park. The eight-mile Mt. Jupiter Trail #809 is ranked as difficult and provides access to Jupiter Lakes.

References

External links
 The Brothers Wilderness U.S. Forest Service
 The Brothers Wilderness Wilderness.net (The University of Montana)

IUCN Category Ib
Protected areas of Jefferson County, Washington
Wilderness areas of Washington (state)
Olympic Mountains
Olympic National Forest
Protected areas established in 1984
1984 establishments in Washington (state)